D14 may refer to:

Vehicles

Aircraft
 Dewoitine D.14, a French transport aircraft
 Fokker D.XIV, a Dutch fighter aircraft

Ships
 , a G- and H-class destroyer of the Royal Hellenic Navy
 , a Battle-class destroyer of the Royal Navy
 , an Avenger-class escort carrier of the Royal Navy

Other
 Allis-Chalmers D14, an American tractor
 Pennsylvania Railroad class D14, an American steam locomotive
 D14/4 Supreme, a BSA Bantam motorbike
 LNER Class D14, a class of British steam locomotives

Other uses 
 D14 road (Croatia)
 D14, a bald eagle from the 2012 clutch of the Decorah Bald Eagles
 D14 series of Honda D engines